A plutocracy or plutarchy is a society that is ruled or controlled by people of great wealth or income. The first known use of the term in English dates from 1631.  Unlike most political systems, plutocracy is not rooted in any established political philosophy.

Usage
The term plutocracy is generally used as a pejorative to describe or warn against an undesirable condition. Throughout history, political thinkers and philosophers have condemned plutocrats for ignoring their social responsibilities, using their power to serve their own purposes and thereby increasing poverty and nurturing class conflict and corrupting societies with greed and hedonism.

Examples
Historic examples of plutocracies include the Roman Empire, some city-states in Ancient Greece, the civilization of Carthage, the Italian merchant city states of Venice, Florence, Genoa, the Dutch Republic and the pre-World War II Empire of Japan (the zaibatsu). According to Noam Chomsky and Jimmy Carter, the modern United States resembles a plutocracy though with democratic forms. A former chairman of the Federal Reserve, Paul Volcker, also believed the US to be developing into a plutocracy.

One modern, formal example of a plutocracy, according to some critics, is the City of London. The City (also called the Square Mile of ancient London, corresponding to the modern financial district, an area of about 2.5 km2) has a unique electoral system for its local administration, separate from the rest of London. More than two-thirds of voters are not residents, but rather representatives of businesses and other bodies that occupy premises in the City, with votes distributed according to their numbers of employees. The principal justification for this arrangement is that most of the services provided by the City of London Corporation are used by the businesses in the City. Around 450,000 non-residents constitute the city's day-time population, far outnumbering the City's 7,000 residents.

In the political jargon and propaganda of Fascist Italy, Nazi Germany, and the Communist International, Western democratic states were referred to as plutocracies, with the implication being that a small number of extremely wealthy individuals were controlling the countries and holding them to ransom. Plutocracy replaced democracy and capitalism as the principal fascist term for the United States and Great Britain during the Second World War. For the Nazis, the term was often a code word for "the Jews".

United States

Some modern historians, politicians, and economists argue that the United States was effectively plutocratic for at least part of the Gilded Age and Progressive Era periods between the end of the Civil War until the beginning of the Great Depression. President Theodore Roosevelt became known as the "trust-buster" for his aggressive use of United States antitrust law, through which he managed to break up such major combinations as the largest railroad and Standard Oil, the largest oil company. According to historian David Burton, "When it came to domestic political concerns, TR's bête noire was the plutocracy." In his autobiographical account of taking on monopolistic corporations as president, Roosevelt recounted

...we had come to the stage where for our people what was needed was a real democracy; and of all forms of tyranny the least attractive and the most vulgar is the tyranny of mere wealth, the tyranny of a plutocracy.

The Sherman Antitrust Act had been enacted in 1890, when large industries reaching monopolistic or near-monopolistic levels of market concentration and financial capital increasingly integrating corporations and a handful of very wealthy heads of large corporations began to exert increasing influence over industry, public opinion and politics after the Civil War. Money, according to contemporary progressive and journalist Walter Weyl, was "the mortar of this edifice", with ideological differences among politicians fading and the political realm becoming "a mere branch in a still larger, integrated business. The state, which through the party formally sold favors to the large corporations, became one of their departments."

In his book The Conscience of a Liberal, in a section entitled "The Politics of Plutocracy", economist Paul Krugman says plutocracy took hold because of three factors: at that time, the poorest quarter of American residents (African-Americans and non-naturalized immigrants) were ineligible to vote, the wealthy funded the campaigns of politicians they preferred, and vote buying was "feasible, easy and widespread", as were other forms of electoral fraud such as ballot-box stuffing and intimidation of the other party's voters.

The U.S. instituted progressive taxation in 1913, but according to Shamus Khan, in the 1970s, elites used their increasing political power to lower their taxes, and today successfully employ what political scientist Jeffrey Winters calls "the income defense industry" to greatly reduce their taxes.

In 1998, Bob Herbert of The New York Times referred to modern American plutocrats as "The Donor Class" (list of top donors) and defined the class, for the first time, as "a tiny group – just one-quarter of 1 percent of the population – and it is not representative of the rest of the nation. But its money buys plenty of access."

Post World War II
In modern times, the term is sometimes used pejoratively to refer to societies rooted in state-corporate capitalism or which prioritize the accumulation of wealth over other interests. According to Kevin Phillips, author and political strategist to Richard Nixon, the United States is a plutocracy in which there is a "fusion of money and government."

Chrystia Freeland, author of Plutocrats: The Rise of the New Global Super Rich and the Fall of Everyone Else, says that the present trend towards plutocracy occurs because the rich feel that their interests are shared by society.

When the Nobel Prize–winning economist Joseph Stiglitz wrote the 2011 Vanity Fair magazine article entitled "Of the 1%, by the 1%, for the 1%", the title and content supported Stiglitz's claim that the United States is increasingly ruled by the wealthiest 1%. Some researchers have said the US may be drifting towards a form of oligarchy, as individual citizens have less impact than economic elites and organized interest groups upon public policy. A study conducted by political scientists Martin Gilens (Princeton University) and Benjamin Page (Northwestern University), which was released in April 2014, stated that their "analyses suggest that majorities of the American public actually have little influence over the policies our government adopts". Gilens and Page do not characterize the US as an "oligarchy" or "plutocracy" per se; however, they do apply the concept of "civil oligarchy" as used by Jeffrey A. Winters with respect to the US.

Russia

Causation
Reasons why a plutocracy develops are complex. In a nation that is experiencing rapid economic growth, income inequality will tend to increase as the rate of return on innovation increases.  In other scenarios, plutocracy may develop when a country is collapsing due to resource depletion as the elites attempt to hoard the diminishing wealth or expand debts to maintain stability, which will tend to enrich creditors and financiers. Economists have also suggested that free market economies tend to drift into monopolies and oligopolies because of the greater efficiency of larger businesses (see economies of scale).

Other nations may become plutocratic through kleptocracy or rent-seeking.

See also

 Aristocracy
 Anarcho-capitalism
 Banana republic
 Corporatocracy
 Elitism
 Kleptocracy
 Neo-feudalism
 Oligarchy
 Overclass
 Plutonomy
 Timocracy
 Upper class
 Wealth concentration

References

Further reading

 Howard, Milford Wriarson (1895). The American plutocracy. New York: Holland Publishing.
 Norwood, Thomas Manson (1888). Plutocracy: or, American white slavery; a politico-social novel. New York: The American News Company.
 Pettigrew, Richard Franklin (1921). ''Triumphant Plutocracy: The Story of American Public Life from 1870 to 1920]. New York: The Academy Press.
 Reed, John Calvin (1903). The New Plutocracy. New York: Abbey Press.
  Winters, Jeffrey A. (2011). [https://archive.org/details/oligarchy0000wint Oligarchy''. Cambridge University Press

External links

 Documentary: Plutocracy Political repression in the U.S.A. part 1, by Metanoia Films
 Documentary: Plutocracy II: Solidarity Forever Political repression in the U.S.A. part 2, by Metanoia Films

17th-century neologisms
Oligarchy
Pejorative terms for forms of government
Political philosophy
Social philosophy
Wealth concentration